In some religious orders of the Catholic Church, a congregation is a group of religious houses. In monastic orders, this would be monasteries; in orders of canons regular, this would be chapters. Each congregation operates as an autonomous or independent subdivision of the religious order, and is presided over by a superior with a title such as abbot general, arch-abbot, abbot president, president, abbot ordinary, provost general or superior general.

List

Canons Regular 
The Annuario Pontificio lists the following as the congregations of the Canons Regular of Saint Augustine, whose abbot primate lives in Rome:

 Canons Regular of the Congregation of the Most Holy Saviour of the Lateran (abbot general in Rome)
 Canons Regular of the Austrian Lateran Congregation (1907 – abbot general in Klosterneuburg, Austria)
 Canons Regular of the Hospitalary Congregation of Great Saint Bernard (11th century – provost general in Martigny, Switzerland)
 Canons Regular of the Swiss Congregation of Saint-Maurice of Agaune (1128 – abbot ordinary in Saint-Maurice, Switzerland)
 Canons Regular of Saint Augustine of the Congregation of Windesheim (1386 – provost general in Paring, Germany)
 Canons Regular of the Congregation of Saint Victor (1968 – abbot general in Champagne-sur-Rhône, France)
 Canons Regular of the Immaculate Conception (1866 – superior general in Rome)
 Canons Regular of the Congregation of the Brothers of Common Life (14th century – superior general in Weilheim, Germany)

Benedictines 
The Annuario Pontificio lists the following congregations of the Benedictine Confederation, whose Abbot Primate lives in Rome:

 English Benedictine Congregation (1336 – Abbot President in Radstock, England)
 Hungarian Congregation (1514 – Archabbot in Pannonhalma, Hungary)
 Swiss Congregation (1602– Abbot President in Bolzano, Italy)
 Austrian Congregation (1625 – Abbot President in Stift Göttweig, Austria)
 Bavarian Congregation (1684 – Abbot President in Kloster Schäftlarn, Germany)
 Brazilian Congregation (1827 – Abbot President in Salvador, Brazil)
 Solesmes Congregation (1837 – Abbot President in Sablé-sur-Sarthe, France)
 American-Cassinese Congregation (1855 – Abbot President in Collegeville, United States)
 Subiaco Cassinese Congregation (1867 – Abbot President in Rome)
 Beuronese Congregation (1873 – Abbot President in Maria Laach, Germany)
 Swiss-American Congregation (1881 – Abbot President in Saint Meinrad, Indiana, United States)
 Ottilien Congregation (1884 – Archabbot President in St. Ottilien Archabbey, Germany)
 Congregation of the Annunciation (1920 – Abbot President in Trier, Germany)
 Slav Congregation (1945 – Prior Administrator in Prague, Czech Republic)
 Cono-Sur Congregation (1976 – Abbot President in Los Toldos, Argentina)

Previously independent monastic orders which have joined the Benedictine Confederation 

 Camaldolese Congregation (980 – Prior General in Camaldoli, Italy)
 Vallombrosian Congregation (1036 – Abbot General in Florence, Italy)
 Sylvestrine Congregation (1231 – Abbot General in Rome)
 Olivetan Congregation (1319 – Abbot General in Asciano, Italy)

Cistercians 
The Annuario Pontificio lists the following congregations of Cistercians, whose Abbot General lives in Rome:

 Castilian Cistercian Congregation (1425 – Abbot General acts as pro-President)
 Cistercian Congregation of St Bernard in Italy (1497 – abbot president in San Severino Marche, Italy)
 Cistercian Congregation of the Crown of Aragon (1616 – abbot president in Poblet, Spain)
 Mehrerau Cistercian Congregation (1624 – abbot president in Bregenz, Austria)
 Austrian Cistercian Congregation (1859 – abbot president in Heiligenkreuz, Austria)
 Cistercian Congregation of the Immaculate Conception (1867 – abbot president in Ile Saint Honorat, France)
 Zirc Cistercian Congregation (1923 – abbot president in Zirc, Hungary)
 Casamari Cistercian Congregation (1929 – abbot president in Casamari, Italy)
 Cistercian Congregation of Mary Queen of the World (1953 – abbot president in Kraków, Poland)
 Brazilian Cistercian Congregation (1961 – abbot president in Itaporanga, Brazil)
 Cistercian Congregation of the Holy Family (1964 – abbot president in Thành-Phô Ho Chí Minh, Vietnam)

See also 
 Religious congregation
 Congregation (Roman Curia)

References 

Organisation of Catholic religious orders